Asimoneura petiolata is a species of tephritid or fruit flies in the genus Trypeta of the family Tephritidae.

Distribution
South Africa.

References

Tephritinae
Insects described in 1931
Diptera of Africa